Brisbane City is the central suburb and central business district of Brisbane, the state capital of  Queensland, Australia. It is colloquially referred to as the "Brisbane CBD" or "the city". It is located on a point on the northern bank of the Brisbane River, historically known as Meanjin, Mianjin  or Meeanjin in the local Aboriginal Australian dialect. The triangular shaped area is bounded by the median of the Brisbane River to the east, south and west. The point, known at its tip as Gardens Point, slopes upward to the north-west where the city is bounded by parkland and the inner city suburb of Spring Hill to the north. The CBD is bounded to the north-east by the suburb of Fortitude Valley. To the west the CBD is bounded by Petrie Terrace, which in 2010 was reinstated as a suburb (after being made a locality of Brisbane City in the 1970s).

In the  the suburb of Brisbane City had a population of 9,460 people.

Geography 
The Brisbane central business district is an area of densely concentrated skyscrapers and other buildings, interspersed by several parks such as Roma Street Parklands, City Botanic Gardens and Wickham Park. It occupies an area of 1.367 km2. The city is laid out according to a grid pattern surveyed during the city's early colonial days, a feature typical of most Australian street patterns.

Most central streets are named after members of the House of Hanover. Queen Street (named in honour of Queen Victoria) is Brisbane's traditional main street and contains its largest pedestrian mall, the Queen Street Mall. Streets named after female members (Adelaide, Alice, Ann, Charlotte, Elizabeth, Margaret, and Mary) run parallel to Queen Street and perpendicular to streets named after male members (Albert, Edward, George, and William).

The CBD's squares include King George Square, Post Office Square and ANZAC Square (home to the city's central war memorial).

The Brisbane central business district was built on a spur of the Taylor Range with the highest spot in the suburb being Wickham Terrace. North Quay is an area in the CBD that was a landing point during the first European exploration of the Brisbane River.

Petrie Bight 

Petrie Bight is a reach of the Brisbane River, which gives its name to the small pocket of land centred on the area under the Story Bridge's northern point, around the Brisbane River to Admiralty Towers II. The location was originally known as Petrie Gardens and was an early settlement farm, one of two that provided food for the colony. The site was named after Andrew Petrie and has been the base for water police and in earlier times wharves. The location of Customs House and the preference for wharves was due to site being directly downstream from the central business district.

History 

Wharf Street Baptist Church opened at 38 Wharf Street (corner of Adelaide Street) on 6 February 1859. It was the first Baptist church to be built in Queensland, the Brisbane congregation having previously met in a range of public buildings since forming in 1855. It was designed in the Early Italianate style and was built by Andrew Petrie. The cost was £2000 for the land and building, but part of the cost was covered by donations, e.g. Thomas Blacket Stephens partially donated the land. In 1881, the church was enlarged, but the need for further growth resulted in a decision to build a new church, the City Tabernacle in Wickham Terrace. The Wharf Street church was sold, holding its last service on 5 October 1890 with the tabernacle being dedicated on 9 October 1890. The building is no longer extant. On Tuesday 25 May 2021, a Baptist Historic plaque was placed at the site to commemorate the church. 

On 2 April 1860 the Queensland Government opened its first school, the Brisbane National School in Adelaide Street under headmaster John Rendall with an initial enrolment of 50 boys and 8 girls.

A congregation of the Church of Christ was established on 23 September 1883 in the Brisbane central area. In the late 1890s the congregation purchased 430 Ann Street to establish their first church, still operating as at 2021 under the name Your Church. 

The Brisbane City Library opened in 1965, moving into Brisbane Square in 2006.

In 2010 and 2011, the city centre was damaged by floods. 

In the  Brisbane City had a population of 9,460 people.

Buildings and precincts 

Some of the first skyscrapers built in the CBD include the SGIO building (now Suncorp Plaza) in 1970 and AMP Place in 1977. Other notable openings included Comalco Place (1984), Riverside Place (1986), the two towers of Central Plaza (1988 and 1989), and Waterfront Place (1990). 

In the last few decades the number of apartment buildings that have been constructed has increased substantially. Brisbane is home to several of Australia's tallest buildings. Brisbane's tallest buildings are Brisbane Skytower at 270 metres, The One at 264 metres, One William Street at 260 metres, Soleil at 243 metres, Aurora Tower at 207 metres, Riparian Plaza at 200 metres, One One One Eagle Street at 195 metres, and Infinity at 249 metres, which was completed in 2014.

The Brisbane CBD is one of the major business hubs in Australia. The City contains many tall office buildings occupied by organisations, businesses and all three levels of government that have emerged into a number of precincts. The areas around the Queen Street Mall and Adelaide Street is primarily a retail precinct. A legal precinct exists around the various court buildings located around the intersections of George Street and Adelaide and Ann Streets.

The government precinct was an area centred on the Executive Building that includes many Queensland Government offices. 111 George Street, Mineral House, and Education House are also located here.  1 William Street was completed in 2016, now serving the role of the former Executive Building.  The Executive Building and Neville Bonner building were demolished for the state's largest infrastructure project. An urban renewal project based around the Queen's Wharf megaproject is under construction along the southern end of William Street, which includes a pedestrian bridge crossing the Riverside Expressway.

Schools 
The city is serviced by a number of schools in the surrounding suburbs including the Petrie Terrace State School in Paddington and The Albert Park Flexi School in Petrie Terrace.

Rental prices 

Like most other Australian capital cities, Brisbane has experienced dramatic rises in rental prices for residential and office space before the global financial crisis. At the beginning of 2008, the Brisbane central business district contained 1.7 million square metres of office space.
High demand in the office market had pushed vacancy rates in the Brisbane CBD to 0.7% by January 2008, the lowest in Australia. Premium grade office space was even less vacant with an occupancy rate of 99.9%. By the end of 2009 the situation had reversed.  In mid 2013 the market for office space had declined to its worst position in two decades with a vacancy rate of just under 13%.

Attractions 

Major landmarks and attractions in the CBD include City Hall (including the Museum of Brisbane), the Story Bridge, the Howard Smith Wharves, ANZAC Square, St John's Cathedral, the Brisbane River and its Riverwalk network, the City Botanic Gardens, Roma Street Parkland, Queensland Parliament House, Old Government House and Customs House.

Heritage listings 

Brisbane has many heritage-listed sites, including:
 a number of properties in Adelaide Street, Brisbane
 a number of properties in Albert Street, Brisbane
 a number of properties in Alice Street, Brisbane
 a number of properties in Ann Street, Brisbane
 Boundary Street: Howard Smith Wharves
 a number of properties in Charlotte Street, Brisbane
 Coronation Drive: Coronation Drive retaining wall
 15 Countess Street: Roma Street railway station
 a number of properties in Creek Street, Brisbane
 118 Eagle Street: Mooney Memorial Fountain
 118A Eagle Street: Eagle Street Fig Trees
 a number of properties in Edward Street, Brisbane
 a number of properties in Elizabeth Street, Brisbane
 a number of properties in Margaret Street, Brisbane
 20–30 Market Street: Wenley House
 a number of properties in Mary Street, Brisbane
 a number of properties in North Quay, Brisbane
 a number of properties in Queen Street, Brisbane
 Skew Street: First Brisbane Burial Ground
 Skew Street: William Jolly Bridge
 168 Turbot Street: Brisbane Dental Hospital and College
 224 Turbot Street: King Edward Park Air Raid Shelter
 436 Upper Roma Street: Hellesvere
 a number of properties in William Street, Brisbane

Population 
In the 2016 Census, there were 9,460 people in Brisbane City. 32.2% of people were born in Australia. The most common countries of birth were China 8.9%, South Korea 8.3%, England 3.7%, Taiwan 3.2% and Brazil 2.8%.  43.7% of people only spoke English at home. Other languages spoken at home included Mandarin 12.3%, Korean 7.7%, Cantonese 3.6%, Spanish 2.9% and Portuguese 2.7%. The most common responses for religion were No Religion 43.0% and Catholic 16.8%.

Transport 

By road, four road bridges connect the CBD with the southern bank of the Brisbane River: the Captain Cook Bridge, the Victoria Bridge, the William Jolly Bridge and the Go Between Bridge. The Story Bridge connects Fortitude Valley with Kangaroo Point and provides access to the city from the southern bank. The Captain Cook Bridge connects the Pacific Motorway, south of the river, with the Riverside Expressway which runs along the south western edge of the city. Heading under and bypassing the CBD is the Clem Jones Tunnel.  Because on-street car parking is in high demand, parking meters are installed across the inner city.

By bicycle and foot, the Goodwill Bridge allows cross river access to South Bank. The Kurilpa Bridge allows cross river access from North Quay to South Brisbane. Cyclists and pedestrians may also cross while using the Victoria, William Jolly, Go Between and Story road bridges.

The Brisbane central business district is the central hub for all public transport services in Brisbane. Bus services are centred on the Queen Street bus station and King George Square busway station. Suburban train services pass through Central railway station, and Roma Street railway station. Roma Street also serves as the terminus for long distance and country services. The central business district is served by various city ferries. Brisbane's CityCat high speed ferry service, popular with tourists and commuters, operates services along the Brisbane River between the University of Queensland and Northshore Hamilton, stopping at several CBD wharves.

The Brisbane Riverwalk, a pedestrian and cyclist pathway adjoins the central business district along the river bank.

In popular culture 
The Brisbane CBD has featured in a number of films, including:
 Inspector Gadget 2, the sequel to Inspector Gadget, featured many scenes showing the Brisbane CBD, South Bank and Kangaroo Point.
 The Marine, a film featuring John Cena, featured the Golden Triangle district of the CBD, during a scene in which an explosion occurred.
 Fool's Gold, a 2008 film featured the CBD primarily the Botanic Gardens throughout the beginning of the film.
 One of Jackie Chan's films, Jackie Chan's First Strike, featured the city in many scenes to the end of the film from Fortitude Valley, east of the CBD.
 The Brisbane CBD was used in Powderfinger's 2009 music video "All of the Dreamers".
 The 2009 vampire film Daybreakers was filmed in Brisbane.
 In the 2015 film San Andreas starring Dwayne Johnson, several streets of the CBD were used to portray San Francisco.
 In the 2017 film Thor: Ragnarok, Mary Street was used in a scene with Chris Hemsworth and Tom Hiddleston to portray New York City.

See also 

 List of Brisbane suburbs

References

Further reading 
 Petrie-Terrace Brisbane 1858–1988 – Its ups and downs, R. Fisher, Boolarong, 1988

External links 

 

 
Suburbs of the City of Brisbane
Central business districts in Australia
Retail buildings in Queensland
1825 establishments in Australia
Populated places established in 1825